The Parlotones are a South African indie rock band from Johannesburg. Formed in 1998, the group consists of Kahn Morbee (vocals and rhythm guitar), Paul Hodgson (lead guitar), Glen Hodgson (bass guitar, keyboards, and backing vocals), and Neil Pauw (drums and percussion). The Parlotones' early sound was rooted in Britpop, but eventually grew to incorporate a wider spectrum of musical genres. The lyrics focus on personal themes, of love and everyday life, paired with catchy melodies that engage their audience.

Within four years, the band signed with Sovereign Entertainment and released their debut album Episoda. The Parlotones have released ten studio albums and are one of South Africa's best-selling music artists of all time, enjoying multi-platinum success. They have won nine South African Music Awards, and, in 2009, were the first South African band to headline at the Coca-Cola Dome. With their success, the band have championed many philanthropic causes, including The Little Wing Music Foundation, the Anene Booysen Foundation, and the Africa-Unite campaign.

History

Formation and early years (1998–2002)
The band formed in Johannesburg in the summer of 1998. Kahn Morbee (real name Dingaan) failed to start a band in high school, explaining that "no one ever gave me a chance", so he decided to enrol at the University of Johannesburg. Shortly after, he was introduced to Neil Pauw, who had attended the same high school in Roodepoort. On hearing Morbee's original songs, Neil realised they shared a music vision and they decided to start a band. At university Kahn met Paul Hodgson, after they were removed from the campus library for playing guitar inside. The next day Kahn asked Paul to join the band. At the time, Paul's younger brother, Glen Hodgson was still in high school, but asked him to join as a bassist. Their early sound was influenced by The Smiths, The Cure, and R.E.M., but their capability was described by Kahn as "punkish and squeaky", and settled on the punk-influenced band name "Crayon".

In July 2002, well-known underground musician, John Boyd joined the band, adding synth elements and doing the band's on-stage engineer during live shows. Around the same time, the band met Raphael Domalik and signed the band to his record label, Sovereign Entertainment. This prompted the band to change their name to something less "immature", as Kahn described it. They decided on The Parlotones, as a variation of Parlophone Records. A record label that had signed their biggest influences Radiohead, who expanded their early influence to include Travis and Jeff Buckley. The group's first release, a South Africa-only EP entitled Superstars, was released in late-2002 and distributed it at performances.

Episoda, Borderline Patrol, and university radio (2003–2005)

By 2003 the band had become prominent in the Johannesburg underground music scene, and had garnered a "small, but loyal" fanbase. John met Andrew Lester, lead singer of 57, who had built his own home studio and had produced his band's debut album. Their record label couldn't afford the studio time, so the band put their money together and went into the studio. After a month, they released Episoda to praise from fellow bands and fans.

At first, the album failed to appeal to national radio stations, like 5FM as it lacked "little commercial potential", explained Paul, and was "definitely too weird for mainstream radio". However, the university radio stations put the album on "high rotation" and it became a regular top download on local music websites. Shortly after regional stations, like Highveld and East Coast Radio, add the song "Long Way Home" to their playlist, which became an "instant crowd-pleaser". This moderate success lead the band to tour in regional music festivals and guest television appearances, on shows like Jip and Good Morning Live.

It was during this time, John decided to retire from music and pursue a career in marketing. The band went on to record and release a second EP, Borderline Patrol, in late 2004. The EP was well received by national radio stations with their first hit-single "Beautiful", charting successfully on 5FM. Closely followed by their second single "Here Comes a Man", a Boom Boom Room cover, entering the Top 20. In April 2005, at a celebration for Cosmopolitan South Africa's twenty-one years of publishing, The Parlotones were invited to share the stage with eight bands. In order to "stand out and be remembered" and fit with the party theme "vintage glam", Kahn suggested the band apply A Clockwork Orange inspired tears with mascara. Kahn later spoke about how he desired a "trademark", noting how he was influenced by "Robert Smith's lipstick [and] Morrissey's quaff".

RadioControlledRobot to now (2005–2009)
The first album to reach mainstream success was their second release, Radiocontrolledrobot through Sovereign Entertainment, which came out in July 2005. It was produced by Dave Birch at Tropical Sweat Studios in Durban, South Africa. The album won the "Best Rock Album" award at the 2006 South African Music Awards. The ballad "Beautiful" was used in an Irish Fujifilm television commercial, which led to a European licence deal with Universal Music. The album achieved Gold status in 2007. Their next album, A World Next Door to Yours, was released in September 2007; and became biggest-selling South African rock album of that decade.
 Sign with Universal Music.

They are spokespersons for both Live Earth and Earth Hour, along with Archbishop Emeritus Desmond Tutu, Prince Charles, and Rihanna.

Life Design to Stand Like Giants (2009–2015)
The Parlotones' video to the single "Life Design", from their third studio album Stardust Galaxies; was added on MTV Europe.

In 2009, the Parlotones played the Midem Talent Showcase in Cannes, France, where they met the American band Blue October. The Parlotones were subsequently invited to play their first US tour as the opening act on Blue October's Pick Up the Phone Tour for their Approaching Normal album.  The match-up proved successful and the Parlotones have gone on to play several more US tours as headliners.

The band performed at the 2010 FIFA World Cup Kick-Off Celebration concert along with Black Eyed Peas, Alicia Keys, and Shakira.

The Parlotones also recorded a song with the lead singer of Freshlyground, Zolani Mahola, called "Stardust Galaxies".

The Parlotones staged an original rock theatre production, Dragonflies and Astronauts, which was broadcast live around the world in 3D via DIRECTV and in 2D on Facebook. The 3D broadcast was so well received in the United States that the satellite provider scheduled 100 re-airings, while more than half of the worldwide viewership on Facebook was from the US. Dragonflies and Astronauts featured songs from the band's catalogue, including 16 songs that were Top 40 hits in South Africa.

Their song "Rock Paper Scissors", featured on the popular American TV series One Tree Hill.

In October 2011, The Parlotones were the opening act for the Cape Town and Johannesburg concerts of Coldplay's tour to South Africa.

In February 2012, The Parlotones were introduced to radio programmers, music supervisors and other industry executives at Michele Clark's Sunset Sessions event in San Diego, CA.  They also showcased at the South by Southwest festival in March 2012 and their song "Honey" subsequently charted at the Triple-A radio format. They also participated at the Sunset Sessions Rock event in June 2012.  Michele Clark became their US manager and was featured in The Parlotone's movie "This is Our Story".     

In September 2012, it was announced that the band was officially moving to Los Angeles, California.
 The Parlotones relocated to the US in January 2013.  The band played two sold-out farewell shows at Kirstenbosch National Botanical Garden and Ellis Park Stadium. The first venue the band played at following their move was The Viper Room in Los Angeles. They toured the US consistently and continued to have success with radio and music supervisors. 

In 2014, the band joined both the Sunset Sessions and SXSW industry festivals again before touring Europe and heading back to South Africa.      

After 12 years alongside record/management label, Sovereign Entertainment, The Parlotones officially announced their departure from both their record label and South African manager on 10 July 2014.
 

Later that year, they announced that all touring was postponed until further notice due to lead singer Kahn Morbee having vocal cord complications requiring surgery. Performances missed as a result of the surgery included a fundraising concert for the Nelson Mandela Children's Hospital in August 2014. The Parlotones resumed touring in 2015 in support of their new album Antiques & Artifacts in a 21 concert South African tour running from April to May. In September 2015, Morbee was announced as one of the coaches for the South African version of The Voice.

Trinkets, Relics & Heirlooms and China (2016–present)
In 2016, the band released the album Trinkets, Relics and Heirlooms. It consisted of new songs from The Parlotones, as well solo recordings from Kahn Morbee and from his side project with Glen Hodgson, Lost & Found. 

In 2017, the band issued the live album Orchestrated, which featured orchestral renditions of their previous songs.

The band was nominated for 23rd South African Music Awards for their album Trinkets, Relics & Heirlooms for Best Rock Album and Best Duo or Group of the Year.

In July 2018, the band announced their tenth studio album China, with the first single released being "Can You Feel It?". The album was notable for the band experimenting with their sound, with Kahn describing it as a "new, yet familiar sound to all of our fans". The album was released on 20 July 2018, seeing an international release by the next year. Other singles for the album were released, with the latest being "Beautiful Life" on 20 March 2020.

In 2019, the band toured by South Africa on "The Unplugged(Ish) Tour" for their compilation Something Old, Something New, Something Borrowed, Something Blue.

In December 11, 2020, the band released a Christmas album named Strike the Harp.

Awards and nominations

Wine brand
On 16 September 2009, The Parlotones together with Hands on Wine released a red wine, "Giant Mistake", named after their single from the album, A World Next Door to Yours. The wine is a blend of Cabernet Sauvignon (54%), Shiraz (23%), Pinotage (12%), and Cabernet Franc (11%).

In April 2010 a white wine, "Push Me to the Floor", was released, named after their single from the album Stardust Galaxies. The wine is a blend of Chenin blanc (60%), Gewürztraminer (15%), Chardonnay (20%,) and Viognier (5%).

On 5 October 2010 a rosé, "We Call This Dancing", was released, named after the song from Stardust Galaxies. The wine is a blend of Wellington Pinotage (55%), Wellington Shiraz (25%), and a balance – a blend of 30 different varietals from the Upper Hemel-en-Aarde Valley near Hermanus (20%).

Band members 
Principal members
 Kahn Morbee – lead vocals, rhythm guitar (1998–present) 
 Paul Hodgson – lead guitar, keyboards (1998–present) 
 Glen Hodgson – bass guitar, piano, backing vocals (1998–present) 
 Neil Pauw – drums, percussion (1998–present)
 Rob Davidson – keyboards (2018–present) 

Early members
 John Boyd – synth, sound effects (2002–2004)

Discography 

Studio albums
 Episoda (Sovereign Entertainment, 2003)
 Radiocontrolledrobot (Sovereign Entertainment, 2005)
 A World Next Door to Yours (Sovereign Entertainment, 2007)
 Stardust Galaxies (Sovereign Entertainment, 2009)
 Eavesdropping on the Songs of Whales (Sovereign Entertainment, 2011)
 Journey Through the Shadows (Sovereign Entertainment, 2012)
 Stand Like Giants (Sovereign Entertainment, 2013)
 Antiques & Artefacts (Gallo, 2015)
 Trinkets, Relics & Heirlooms (Gallo, 2016)
 China (Gallo, 2018)
 Strike the Harp (Gallo, 2020)

References

External links
 Official Website

South African indie rock groups
Musical groups established in 1998
1998 establishments in South Africa
South African alternative rock groups